The 2016 Copa Colsanitas (also known as the 2016 Claro Open Colsanitas) was a women's tennis tournament played on outdoor clay courts. It was the 19th edition of the Copa Colsanitas, and part of the International category of the 2016 WTA Tour. It took place at the Centro de Alto Rendimiento in Bogotá, Colombia, from April 11 through April 17, 2016.

Points and prize money

Point distribution

Prize money

Singles main-draw entrants

Seeds 

 1 Rankings as of 4 April 2016.

Other entrants 
The following players received wildcards into the singles main draw:
  Emiliana Arango
  Nadia Echeverría Alam
  Yuliana Lizarazo

The following players received entry from the qualifying draw:
  Sanaz Marand 
  Tereza Martincová
  Chloé Paquet
  Catalina Pella
  Conny Perrin
  Daniela Seguel

Withdrawals 
Before the tournament
  Jana Čepelová → replaced by  Amra Sadiković
  Lauren Davis → replaced by  Sílvia Soler Espinosa
  Alexa Glatch → replaced by  Marina Melnikova
  Kristína Kučová → replaced by  Paula Cristina Gonçalves
  Varvara Lepchenko → replaced by  Alexandra Panova
  Alizé Lim → replaced by  Elitsa Kostova
  Petra Martić → replaced by  Laura Pous Tió
  Christina McHale → replaced by  İpek Soylu

Doubles main-draw entrants

Seeds 

 Rankings are as of April 4, 2016.

Other entrants 
The following pair received a wildcard into the doubles main draw:
  Nadia Echeverría Alam /  Yuliana Lizarazo

Champions

Singles 

  Irina Falconi def.  Sílvia Soler Espinosa, 6–2, 2–6, 6–4

Doubles 

  Lara Arruabarrena /  Tatjana Maria def.  Gabriela Cé /  Andrea Gámiz, 6–2, 4–6, [10–8]

References

External links 
 

Copa Claro Colsanitas
Copa Colsanitas
Copa Claro Colsanitas